Oleg is a Slavic masculine given name.

Oleg may also refer to
 Oleg (dance) in Indonesia
 Oleg (film), a 2019 film
 Russian ship Oleg, multiple articles
 Oleg Cassini, Inc., an American fashion house

People
 Oleg of Novgorod, a Varangian prince who ruled all or part of the Rus' people during the late 9th and early 10th centuries
 Oleg of Drelinia (957?-977), a Rurikid ruler of the Drevlians from 969 to 977
 Oleg I of Chernigov (also known as Oleg Svyatoslavich) (1052-1115), a Rurikid prince
 Oleg III Svyatoslavich (1147-1204), a Rurikid prince
 Oleg I of Ryazan, Grand Prince of Ryazan from 1252 to 1258
 Oleg II of Ryazan, Grand Prince of Ryazan from 1350 to 1402
 Prince Oleg Konstantinovich of Russia (1892-1914), son of Grand Duke Konstantin Konstantinovich of Russia

Fictional characters 
 Oleg, the original name of Teach from Xenoblade Chronicles 3

See also
 Oleh (disambiguation)